Parmouti 22 - Coptic calendar - Parmouti 24

The twenty-third day of the Coptic month of Parmouti, the eighth month of the Coptic year. In common years, this day corresponds to April 18, of the Julian Calendar, and May 1, of the Gregorian Calendar. This day falls in the Coptic Season of Shemu, the season of the Harvest.

Commemorations

Martyrs 

 The martyrdom of Saint George

References 

Days of the Coptic calendar